In mathematics, the cotangent complex is a common generalisation of the cotangent sheaf, normal bundle and virtual tangent bundle of a map of geometric spaces such as manifolds or schemes. It is constructed as an object in a certain derived category of sheaves on  using the methods of homotopical algebra.

Restricted versions of cotangent complexes were first defined in various cases by a number of authors in the early 1960s. In the late 1960s, Michel André and Daniel Quillen independently came up with the correct definition for a morphism of commutative rings, using simplicial methods to make precise the idea of the cotangent complex as given by taking the (non-abelian) left derived functor of Kähler differentials. Luc Illusie then globalized this definition to the general situation of a morphism of ringed topoi, thereby incorporating morphisms of ringed spaces, schemes, and algebraic spaces into the theory.

Motivation
The most basic motivation for such an object is the exact sequence of Kähler differentials associated to two morphisms. If  is another variety, and if  is another morphism, then there is an exact sequence

In some sense, therefore, relative Kähler differentials are a right exact functor. (Literally this is not true, however, because the category of algebraic varieties is not an abelian category, and therefore right-exactness is not defined.) In fact, prior to the definition of the cotangent complex, there were several definitions of functors that might extend the sequence further to the left, such as the Lichtenbaum–Schlessinger functors  and imperfection modules. Most of these were motivated by deformation theory.

This sequence is exact on the left if the morphism  is smooth. If Ω admitted a first derived functor, then exactness on the left would imply that the connecting homomorphism vanished, and this would certainly be true if the first derived functor of f, whatever it was, vanished. Therefore, a reasonable speculation is that the first derived functor of a smooth morphism vanishes. Furthermore, when any of the functors which extended the sequence of Kähler differentials were applied to a smooth morphism, they too vanished, which suggested that the cotangent complex of a smooth morphism might be equivalent to the Kähler differentials.

Another natural exact sequence related to Kähler differentials is the conormal exact sequence. If f is a closed immersion with ideal sheaf I, then there is an exact sequence

This is an extension of the exact sequence above: There is a new term on the left, the conormal sheaf of f, and the relative differentials ΩX/Y have vanished because a closed immersion is formally unramified. If f is the inclusion of a smooth subvariety, then this sequence is a short exact sequence. This suggests that the cotangent complex of the inclusion of a smooth variety is equivalent to the conormal sheaf shifted by one term.

Early work on cotangent complexes
Cotangent complexes appeared in multiple and partially incompatible versions of increasing generality in the early 1960s. The first instance of the related homology functors in the restricted context of field extensions appeared in Cartier (1956). Alexander Grothendieck then developed an early version of cotangent complexes in 1961 for his general Riemann-Roch theorem in algebraic geometry in order to have a theory of virtual tangent bundles. This is the version described by Pierre Berthelot in SGA 6, Exposé VIII. It only applies when f is a smoothable morphism (one that factors into a closed immersion followed by a smooth morphism). In this case, the cotangent complex of f as an object in the derived category of coherent sheaves on X is given as follows:

If J is the ideal of X in V, then 
 for all other i.
The differential  is the pullback along i of the inclusion of J in the structure sheaf  of V followed by the universal derivation 
All other differentials are zero. 
This definition is independent of the choice of V, and for a smoothable complete intersection morphism, this complex is perfect. Furthermore, if  is another smoothable complete intersection morphism and if an additional technical condition is satisfied, then there is an exact triangle

In 1963 Grothendieck developed a more general construction that removes the restriction to smoothable morphisms (which also works in contexts other than algebraic geometry). However, like the theory of 1961, this produced a cotangent complex of length 2 only, corresponding to the truncation  of the full complex which was not yet known at the time. This approach was published later in Grothendieck (1968). At the same time in the early 1960s, largely similar theories were independently introduced for commutative rings (corresponding to the "local" case of affine schemes in algebraic geometry) by Gerstenhaber and Lichtenbaum and Schlessinger. Their theories extended to cotangent complexes of length 3, thus capturing more information.

The definition of the cotangent complex
The correct definition of the cotangent complex begins in the homotopical setting. Quillen and André worked with the simplicial commutative rings, while Illusie worked more generally with simplicial ringed topoi, thus covering "global" theory on various types of geometric spaces. For simplicity, we will consider only the case of simplicial commutative rings. Such a resolution of  can be constructed by using the free commutative -algebra functor which takes a set  and yields the free -algebra . For example, there are two augmentation maps  via the ruleswhich can be adapted to each of the free -algebras .

Applying the Kähler differential functor to  produces a simplicial -module. The total complex of this simplicial object is the cotangent complex LB/A. The morphism r induces a morphism from the cotangent complex to ΩB/A called the augmentation map. In the homotopy category of simplicial A-algebras (or of simplicial ringed topoi), this construction amounts to taking the left derived functor of the Kähler differential functor.

Given a commutative square as follows:

there is a morphism of cotangent complexes  which respects the augmentation maps. This map is constructed by choosing a free simplicial C-algebra resolution of D, say  Because  is a free object, the composite hr can be lifted to a morphism  Applying functoriality of Kähler differentials to this morphism gives the required morphism of cotangent complexes. In particular, given homomorphisms  this produces the sequence

There is a connecting homomorphism,

which turns this sequence into an exact triangle.

A pair of composable morphisms,  and  induces an exact triangle in the homotopy category,

Cotangent complexes in deformation theory

Setup 
One of the first direct applications of the cotangent complex is in deformation theory. The cotangent complex  then controls the information related to this problem. We can reformulate it as considering the set of extensions of the commutative diagramwhich is a homological problem. Furthermore, from the other direction, if there is a short exact sequencethere exists a corresponding elementwhose vanishing implies it is a solution to the deformation problem given above. Furthermore, the groupcontrols the set of automorphisms for any fixed solution to the deformation problem.

Some important implications 
One of the most geometrically important properties of the cotangent complex is the fact that given a morphism of -schemeswe can form the relative cotangent complex  as the cone offitting into a distinguished triangleThis is one of the pillars for cotangent complexes because it implies the deformations of the morphism  of -schemes is controlled by this complex. This is a powerful technique and is foundational to Gromov-Witten theory (see below), which studies morphisms from algebraic curves of a fixed genus and fixed number of punctures to a scheme .

Properties of the cotangent complex

Flat base change
Suppose that B and C are A-algebras such that  for all . Then there are quasi-isomorphisms

The first formula then proves that the construction of the cotangent complex is local on the base in the flat topology.

Vanishing properties
Let . Then:

If B is a localization of A, then .
If f is an étale morphism, then .
In particular, it has projective dimension zero.
If f is a local complete intersection morphism, then  is a perfect complex with Tor amplitude in [-1,0].
If f is a morphism of perfect k-algebras over a perfect field k of characteristic , then .

Characterization of local complete intersections 
The theory of the cotangent complex allows one to give a homological characterization of local complete intersection (lci) morphisms, at least under noetherian assumptions. Let  be a morphism of noetherian rings such that B is a finitely generated A-algebra. As reinterpreted by Quillen, work of Lichtenbaum–Schlessinger shows that the second André–Quillen homology group  vanishes for all B-modules M if and only if f is lci. Thus, combined with the above vanishing result we deduce:

The morphism  is lci if and only if  is a perfect complex with Tor amplitude in [-1,0].

Quillen further conjectured that if the cotangent complex  has finite projective dimension and B is of finite Tor dimension as an A-module, then f is lci. This was proven by Luchezar Avramov in a 1999 Annals paper. Avramov also extended the notion of lci morphism to the non-finite type setting, assuming only that the morphism f is locally of finite flat dimension, and he proved that the same homological characterization of lci morphisms holds there (apart from  no longer being perfect). Avramov's result was recently improved by Briggs–Iyengar, who showed that the lci property follows once one establishes that  vanishes for any single .

In all of this, it is necessary to suppose that the rings in question are noetherian. For example, let k be a perfect field of characteristic . Then as noted above,  vanishes for any morphism  of perfect k-algebras. But not every morphism of perfect k-algebras is lci.

Flat descent 
Bhargav Bhatt showed that the cotangent complex satisfies (derived) faithfully flat descent. In other words, for any faithfully flat morphism  of R-algebras, one has an equivalence 

in the derived category of R, where the right-hand side denotes the homotopy limit of the cosimplicial object given by taking  of the Čech conerve of f. (The Čech conerve is the cosimplicial object determining the Amitsur complex.) More generally, all the exterior powers of the cotangent complex satisfy faithfully flat descent.

Examples

Smooth schemes 
Let  be smooth. In Berthelot's framework, this is clear by taking .

Closed embeddings in smooth schemes 
Using the exact triangle corresponding to the morphisms , we may determine the cotangent complex . The exact triangle implies that  is nonzero only in the first degree, and in that degree, it is the kernel of the map  This kernel is the conormal bundle, and the exact sequence is the conormal exact sequence, so in the first degree,  is the conormal bundle .

Local complete intersection 

Cotangent complexes in Gromov-Witten theory 
In Gromov–Witten theory mathematicians study the enumerative geometric invariants of n-pointed curves on spaces. In general, there are algebraic stackswhich are the moduli spaces of mapsfrom genus  curves with  punctures to a fixed target. Since enumerative geometry studies the generic behavior of such maps, the deformation theory controlling these kinds of problems requires the deformation of the curve , the map , and the target space . Fortunately, all of this deformation theoretic information can be tracked by the cotangent complex . Using the distinguished triangleassociated to the composition of morphismsthe cotangent complex can be computed in many situations. From general theory of triangulated categories, the cotangent complex  is quasi-isomorphic to the cone

See also
André–Quillen cohomology
Deformation theory
Exalcomm
Kodaira-Spencer class
Atiyah class

Notes

References

Applications 

 https://mathoverflow.net/questions/372128/what-is-the-cotangent-complex-good-for

Generalizations 

 The logarithmic cotangent complex
 The cotangent complex and Thom spectra

References 

Algebraic geometry
Category theory
Homotopical algebra
Homotopy theory